The 2018–19 Coppa Titano was the 61st edition of the football competition in San Marino. The cup was contested under a new format this season. The competition began on 23 October 2018 and ended on 19 April 2019.

S.P. La Fiorita were the defending cup champions after winning the previous tournament by defeating S. P. Tre Penne in the final by the score of 3–2 after extra time.

Format
The draw for the opening round was held on 30 August 2018. The final was contested over one leg, all other rounds were contested over two legs. When a winner was not determined in regular time, extra time and then penalties were used to determine a winner.

First round
The first legs of the first round were played on 23–24 October 2018, and the second legs were played on 6–7 November 2018. The draw for the first round was held on 30 August 2018.

|}

Quarter–finals
The first legs of the quarter–finals were played on 4–5 December 2018, and the second legs were played on 16 December 2018.

|}

Semi–finals
The first legs of the semi–finals will be played on 6–7 April 2019, and the second legs will be played on 13–14 April 2019.

|}

Final
The final was played 19 April 2019.

Bracket

See also
 2018–19 Campionato Sammarinese di Calcio

External links
 official site (Italian)
 uefa.com

References

Coppa Titano seasons
San Marino
Coppa Titano